Steve Gehrke (born 1971) is an American poet.

Life
He was raised in Mankato, Minnesota.  He graduated from Minnesota State University, and University of Texas-Austin, with an MFA.  He graduated from the University of Missouri with a Ph.D., where he studied with Lynne McMahon, and Sherod Santos.  He was poetry editor of the Missouri Review.
He taught at the University of Missouri, Seton Hall University, and Gettysburg College. He currently teaches in the MFA program at the University of Nevada, Reno.

His work has appeared in The Georgia Review, Indiana Review, and Mississippi Review, The Yale Review, Slate, The Iowa Review, The Kenyon Review.

He is the nephew of Tom Montag.
He had kidney failure, and his sister, Gwen, donated a kidney.

Awards
 1999 John Ciardi Prize for Poetry
 2002 Philip Levine Prize in Poetry
 2005 National Poetry Series
 2009 Lannan Foundation, Marfa Residency

Works

Anthologies

Reviews
Steve Gehrke also seeks to comprehend beauty in the mystery of the human body, yet Gehrke's search for comfort and understanding leads in rather a different direction than Stevens' abstractions, taking us through an unvarnished look at the body's flaws and failings that is another aspect of its power to inspire awe. Through the eyes of both patients and artists, Steve Gehrke examines "the world in repair." The savage and strange exploration of fragility embodied in this collection of poems nevertheless has the capacity to lend unexpected comforts to a reader faced with an inescapable mortality.

References

External links
"Author's website"
"Q&A with Steve Gehrke", A1 Poetry Post, March 22, 2008
"cherry series round 1: NADINE MEYER / STEVE GEHRKE", Rice Review, October 8, 2007

1972 births
Living people
American male poets
Minnesota State University, Mankato alumni
University of Texas at Austin alumni
University of Missouri alumni
University of Missouri faculty
Seton Hall University faculty
Gettysburg College faculty
21st-century American poets
21st-century American male writers